Kethireddy Venkatarami Reddy is an Indian politician in the state of Andhra Pradesh. In 2019 General elections he won as MLA from Dharmavaram constituency in Andhra Pradesh.

References

Andhra Pradesh politicians
Andhra Pradesh MLAs 2019–2024
1982 births
YSR Congress Party politicians
Living people
People from Anantapur district